The Constituent Assembly of Tunisia, or National Constituent Assembly (NCA) was the body in charge of devising a new Tunisian constitution for the era after the fall of President Zine El Abidine Ben Ali and his Constitutional Democratic Rally (RCD)–regime. Convoked after the election on 23 October 2011, the convention consisted of 217 lawmakers representing Tunisians living both in the country and abroad. A plurality of members came from the moderate Islamist Ennahda Movement. The Assembly held its first meeting on 22 November 2011, and was dissolved and replaced by the Assembly of the Representatives of the People on 26 October 2014.

Convocation
Provisionally, a time of approximately one year was envisioned to develop the new constitution, although the convention itself was to determine its own schedule.

Before the first session of the NCA, the Ennahda, Congress for the Republic (CPR) and Ettakatol agreed to share the three highest posts in state. Accordingly, the parliament voted Mustapha Ben Jafar (Ettakatol) speaker of the NCA upon being convoked on 22 November. Meherzia Labidi (Ennahda) and Larbi Abid (CPR) were elected Deputy Speakers.

Provisional constitution and presidential election
On 10 December 2011, the assembly adopted a provisional constitution (Law on the provisional organisation of public powers) According to articles VIII and IX of the document, the requirements for the eligibility as president are exclusive Tunisian nationality (excluding citizens with dual nationality), having Tunisian parentage, religious affiliation to Islam, and an age of 35 years or more. 141 delegates approved of the law, 37 voted against, and 39 abstained.

On 12 December 2011, the NCA elected the human rights activist and CPR leader Moncef Marzouki as the interim President of the Tunisian Republic. 153 delegates voted for him, three against, and 44 votes were blank. Blank votes were the result of a boycott from the opposition parties, who disagreed with the new "mini-constitution".

On 14 December, one day after his accession to office, Marzouki appointed Hamadi Jebali, the secretary-general of the Ennahda Movement as Prime Minister. Jebali presented his government on 20 December, and officially took office on 24 December.

|- style="background:#E9E9E9;"
! colspan=3|Candidacy of Moncef Marzouki of the Congress for the Republic
|- style="background:#E9E9E9;"
! align="left"|Choice !! Votes !! %
|-
|align="left"| For||153||75.7
|-
|align="left"|Against||3||1.5
|-
|align="left"|Blank||44||20.3
|-
|align="left"|Abstentions||2||1.0
|- style="background:#F2F2F2;"
! align="left"|Total !! 202 !! 100.0
|- style="background:#F2F2F2;"
|align="left"|Voter turnout
|colspan="2"|93.1
|- style="background:#F2F2F2;"
|align="left"|Electorate
|colspan="2"|217
|-
|colspan="3"|Source: AFP
|}

Constitution drafting process
The actual process of drafting the new constitution started on 13 February 2012. The assembly established six committees, each in charge of one of the individual themes of the constitution. The first commission was responsible for the preamble and the general principles and amendments. Each of the committees consisted of 22 lawmakers and mirrored the relative strength of the political groups in the assembly. The most crucial question was the form of government. While the Islamist Ennahda movement favoured a parliamentary system, its secular coalition partners CPR and Ettakatol, as well as most of the minor opposition parties preferred a semi-presidential republic. The new Tunisian constitution was passed on 26 January 2014.

Party standings
The party standings as of the election and as of 26 October 2014 were as follows:

Note: 1Split from Ennahda.
2Split from CPR.
3Mostly composed of former members of Popular Petition.
4Split from Popular Petition.
5Split from FDTL.
6Merged into PR.
7Merger of PDP, Afek Tounes, minor parties and independents.
8Split from PDP.
9Dissolved. Most members joined VDS.
10Mostly composed of former members of PDM.
11Merged into PR. Later revived.
12Founded after the 2011 election; was joined by defectors from different parties.

See also
Politics of Tunisia
List of legislatures by country

References

External links 
 

 
Government of Tunisia
Tunisian Revolution
2011 establishments in Tunisia
Tunisia